Ternstroemia subsessilis, the el yunque colorado, is a species of plant in the Pentaphylacaceae family. It is endemic to Puerto Rico.  It is threatened by habitat loss.

References

subsessilis
Endemic flora of Puerto Rico
Critically endangered plants
Taxonomy articles created by Polbot